The SUNY-ESF Ranger School (formerly the New York State Ranger School), on the east branch of the Oswegatchie River near Wanakena, New York, offers A.A.S. degrees in forest and natural resources management. Established in 1912, the school is affiliated with the State University of New York College of Environmental Science and Forestry (SUNY-ESF). The Ranger School commemorated its centennial in 2012-13.

Location

The Ranger School is situated in the northwestern part of the Adirondack Park, on the east branch of the scenic Oswegatchie River, which flows into Cranberry Lake.

History
The New York State Ranger School was founded in 1912, under the administration of the New York State College of Forestry at Syracuse University, to train forest rangers and other personnel for the still-young Adirondack Park. Eugene S. Whitmore, the Ranger School's first graduate, completed his studies the same year that school was founded, in 1912. More than 3000 students have completed their degrees at the Ranger School since it opened. The Ranger School celebrated its centennial anniversary in 2012-13.

Leadership 
 Professor James F. Dubuar served as Director of the Ranger School for 37 years, from 1921-1957.

Properties 
 In 1923, Governor Alfred E. Smith, later to become President of the Board of Trustees of the New York State College of Forestry, signed an appropriation bill for the construction of the Ranger School's new building; the structure was dedicated in 1928. 

Today
Today, the Ranger School is a unit of SUNY-ESF. Mariann Johnston, Professor of Forest and Natural Resources Management, is director.

After "spending a year at a college of their choice," students spend an academic year or summer at the residential school, studying forest technology, land surveying technology, or environmental and natural resources conservation, earning an Associate of Applied Science (A.A.S.) degree upon completion. Students can continue their studies at the main ESF campus, in Syracuse, to earn a bachelor's degree.

References

Notes

Further reading 
 Coufal, James E. 2001. "James F. Dubuar: Lessons Learned from the Man," Forest History Today, Spring/Fall, pp. 29-35 (with historical photos of the Ranger School).

External links

 
 Ranger School Centennial, 2012-13
 Admission to the Ranger School
 Forest Technician Schools in the United States
 Council of Eastern Forest Technician Schools

1912 establishments in New York (state)
Adirondack Park
SUNY-ESF Ranger School
Environment of New York (state)
Forestry education
SUNY-ESF Ranger School
New York State College of Forestry
State University of New York College of Environmental Science and Forestry
Universities and colleges in St. Lawrence County, New York
Technical schools